A defensive publication, or defensive disclosure, is an intellectual property strategy used to prevent another party from obtaining a patent on a product, apparatus or method for instance. The strategy consists in disclosing an enabling description and/or drawing of the product, apparatus or method so that it enters the public domain and becomes prior art. Therefore, the defensive publication of perhaps otherwise patentable information may work to defeat the novelty of a subsequent patent application.  Unintentional defensive publication by incidental disclosure can render intellectual property as prior art.

One reason why companies decide to use defensive publication over patents is cost.  In the United States, for example, to obtain a published patent application, one must incur at least filing fee, examination fee, search fees, and early publication fees (currently $530, minimum plus $300 for early publication), and meet the filing requirements for a proper patent application.
"The defensive publication route is especially useful for innovations that do not warrant the high costs incurred in patent applications but to which scientists do want to retain access."

See also 
 Cloem, a company creating computer-generated variants of patent claims, which may potentially be defensively published
 IBM Technical Disclosure Bulletin
 Trade secret
 United States Defensive Publication (existing between April 1968 and May 8, 1985)
 United States Statutory Invention Registration (existing until 2013)

References

Further reading 
 Johnson, Justin P., Defensive Publishing by a Leading Firm (October 8, 2004).
 Baker, Scott and Doug Lichtman and Claudio Mezzetti, Disclosure And Investment As Strategies In The Patent Race, University of Chicago Law School. 2000. (pdf)

Patent law